Baetora (also Sungaloge or South Maewo, is an Oceanic language spoken on Maewo, Vanuatu. There is a large degree of dialectal diversity.

References

Penama languages
Languages of Vanuatu